Oliviero Garlini (born 4 March 1957 in Stezzano) is a retired Italian professional footballer who played as a striker.

1957 births
Living people
Italian footballers
Serie A players
Serie B players
Serie C players
Como 1907 players
Empoli F.C. players
Alma Juventus Fano 1906 players
A.C. Cesena players
S.S. Lazio players
Inter Milan players
Atalanta B.C. players
A.C. Ancona players
Ascoli Calcio 1898 F.C. players
Ravenna F.C. players
Sportspeople from the Province of Bergamo
Association football forwards
Footballers from Lombardy